The 2015 Women's Hockey Under-21 Invitational Tournament was an invitational women's under-21 field hockey competition, hosted by Hockey Netherlands. The tournament took place between 19–25 July 2015 in Breda, Netherlands. A total of five teams competed for the title. It was held alongside a men's tournament. 

The Netherlands won the tournament, defeating China 5–1 in the final. India defeated England 1–0 in penalties, after the third place match finished 1–1.

Teams
Including the Netherlands, 5 teams were invited by Hockey Netherlands to participate in the tournament. The team from England however, comprised players up to 23 years of age. 

 
 
 
 
  (host nation)

Officials
The following umpires were appointed by the International Hockey Federation to officiate the tournament:

 Fanneke Alkemade (NED)
 Vilma Bagdanskiene (LTU)
 Durga Devi (IND)
 Maggie Giddens (USA)
 Emma Shelbourn (ENG)
 Sandra Wagner (GER)
 Katrina Woolf (NZL)
 Ju Xiaoyu (CHN)

Results

Preliminary round

Fixtures

Classification round

Fifth and sixth place

Third and fourth place

Final

Statistics

Final standings

Goalscorers

References

External links
International Hockey Federation

2015 in women's field hockey
2015 Women's Hockey Under-21 Invitational Tournament
July 2015 sports events in Europe